The 2020–21 season was Milton Keynes Dons' 17th season in their existence, and the club's second consecutive season in League One. The club also competed in the FA Cup, EFL Cup and EFL Trophy.

Due to the impact of the COVID-19 pandemic, league fixtures commenced on 12 September 2020, approximately a month later than previous seasons.

The season covers the period from 1 July 2020 to 30 June 2021.

Competitions

League One

League table

Results summary

Results by matchday

Matches

FA Cup

Matches

EFL Cup

Matches

EFL Trophy

Southern Group C Table

Matches

Player details
 Note: Players' ages as of the club's opening fixture of the 2020–21 season.

Transfers

Transfers in

Transfers out

Loans in

Loans out

References

External links

Official Supporters Association website
MK Dons news on MKWeb

Milton Keynes Dons
Milton Keynes Dons F.C. seasons